The Moore League is a high school sports league in Southern California.  It comprises seven schools: public traditional high schools of the Long Beach Unified School District plus Compton High School. The league is administered by the California Interscholastic Federation (CIF) Southern Section.

Member schools
 Cabrillo High School
 Jordan High School
 Lakewood High School
 Millikan High School
 Polytechnic High School
 Wilson High School
 Compton High School

Origins
The Moore League was founded in 1957.  As of 1963, Downey High School was a member, and Compton High was not yet a member.  Cabrillo High was established in 1995, and became the Moore League's seventh member. El Rancho High School was a member of the Moore League from 1969 to 1971

Harry J. Moore
The Moore League is named for Harry J. Moore, who was an educator in Long Beach, California.  He held the following positions, titles and honors:

 Assistant Superintendent in the Long Beach Public Schools (Long Beach Unified School District)
 Director of High Schools, Public School System, Long Beach
 Honorary Inductee, Wilson High School Athletics Hall of Fame

References

CIF Southern Section leagues